Paul Raymond Paton (born 18 April 1987) is a professional footballer who plays as a defensive midfielder for West of Scotland Football League club Glenafton Athletic.

He has previously played for Queen's Park, Partick Thistle, Dundee United, St Johnstone, Plymouth Argyle, Falkirk, Dunfermline Athletic, East Kilbride and Dumbarton, and had a spell on loan to Airdrieonians.

Born in Scotland, Paton has represented Northern Ireland at international level.

Club career

Queen's Park
Paton played for Queen's Park from 2005 until 2008. His displays at right back were key in Queen's winning promotion to the Second Division. He scored the goal which gave Queen's the lead in the second leg of the playoff final against East Fife at New Bayview.

Partick Thistle
Paton signed for Partick Thistle in May 2008, on a three-year contract. He played a significant role in Thistle winning promotion in the 2012–13 season, during which he was the club captain.

Dundee United
On 16 April 2013 it was announced that Paton would follow former Thistle manager Jackie McNamara, along with Thistle teammate Chris Erskine, to join Dundee United for the start of the 2013–14 season. Paton scored his first goal for the club in a 4–0 win against Motherwell. Having established himself as a first team regular, Paton was rewarded with a contract extension at the beginning of the following season to keep him at the club until 2017. In the 2014–15 season Paton was named as SPFL Player of the Month for September 2014.

On 18 December 2014, Paton was found guilty by an SFA Disciplinary Tribunal of spitting at Aberdeen player Jonny Hayes during the match between Dundee United and Aberdeen five days earlier, and was given a two-match suspension, despite Hayes saying that Paton had not spat at him. Dundee United announced they would be appealing the suspension but were told that the SFA's fast-track judicial system did not allow this.

In April 2015, Paton suffered a knee injury which kept him out for the rest of the season and the most of the 2015–16 season. He made his return for United in the latter stages of a Scottish Cup fourth round match against Airdrieonians where United won 1–0 in January 2016. He scored his first goal of the season in the final minutes of a 2–1 win over Heart of Midlothian to put United into the lead with a 25-yard strike. United were relegated to the Scottish Championship at the end of the season. In June 2016, he left United by mutual agreement with the club.

St Johnstone
After leaving Dundee United, Paton signed a two-year contract with St Johnstone. Paton was released from his contract with St Johnstone on 31 January 2018.

Plymouth Argyle
Paton signed for English EFL League One club Plymouth Argyle in March 2018.

Return to Scotland
Paton signed a two-year contract with Scottish Championship club Falkirk in June 2018. After one season with Falkirk, Paton signed for rivals Dunfermline Athletic on 14 June 2019. Paton, who was appointed captain of the club, was released in May 2020 at the end of his contract. On 8 July 2020, Paton joined Lowland League side East Kilbride. With the Lowland League season suspended due to the COVID-19 pandemic, Paton joined League One club Airdrieonians on loan in March 2021, until the end of the 2020–21 season. After turning down a new deal at East Kilbride, Paton joined Dumbarton in June 2021. His first Sons goal was an injury time equaliser against former club Airdrieonians at a time where Dumbarton had just eight men, in a game they eventually lost 3-2. He left the club at the end of the 2021–22 season following the Sons' relegation to Scottish League Two. In June 2022, Paton signed for Glenafton Athletic of the West of Scotland Football League.

International career
On 1 March 2014, Paton was called up to the full Northern Ireland squad for their friendly international against Cyprus. He qualifies to play for Northern Ireland through his father, who was born in Larne.

Personal life
In October 2014, Paton was arrested in connection with an alleged assault on Celtic goalkeeper Lukasz Zaluska along with former Stenhousemuir goalkeeper Chris McCluskey. Two Dundee United players, Paton and Mark Wilson, had been dropped from the team pending a club investigation. Paton was subsequently charged with assaulting Zaluska. He later pleaded guilty on one charge of assault and was fined £500.

Career statistics

References

External links

1987 births
Living people
Scottish people of Irish descent
Footballers from Paisley, Renfrewshire
Association footballers from Northern Ireland
Northern Ireland international footballers
Scottish footballers
Scottish people of Northern Ireland descent
Scottish expatriate sportspeople in Switzerland
Association football midfielders
Queen's Park F.C. players
Partick Thistle F.C. players
Dundee United F.C. players
St Johnstone F.C. players
Plymouth Argyle F.C. players
Falkirk F.C. players
Dunfermline Athletic F.C. players
East Kilbride F.C. players
Scottish Football League players
Scottish Professional Football League players
Airdrieonians F.C. players
English Football League players
Lowland Football League players
Dumbarton F.C. players
Glenafton Athletic F.C. players
West of Scotland Football League players